The Drennen-Scott House is a historic house museum on North 3rd Street in Van Buren, Arkansas.  It is a single-story log structure, finished in clapboards, with a side-gable roof that has a slight bell-cast shape due to the projection of the roof over the front porch that extends across the width of its main block.  The house was built in 1836 by John Drennen, one of Van Buren's first settlers.  Drennen and his brother-in-law David Thompson were responsible for platting the town, and Drennen was politically active, serving in the territorial and state legislatures, and at the state constitutional convention.  The house remained in the hands of Drennen descendants until it was acquired by the University of Arkansas at Fort Smith, which operates it as a house museum.

The house was listed on the National Register of Historic Places in 1971.

See also
National Register of Historic Places listings in Crawford County, Arkansas
List of the oldest buildings in Arkansas

References

External links

Drennen-Scott House web site
UAFS Drennen-Scott House - City of Van Buren

Houses on the National Register of Historic Places in Arkansas
Houses completed in 1836
Houses in Crawford County, Arkansas
Historic house museums in Arkansas
Museums in Crawford County, Arkansas
National Register of Historic Places in Crawford County, Arkansas
Buildings and structures in Van Buren, Arkansas